Alexandra Isley is an American singer-songwriter and producer. She released her debut EP The Love/Art Memoirs in 2012. Isley has worked with artists including Scarface, Terrace Martin, Masego, 9th Wonder, Tank and the Bangas, and Lucky Daye.

Early life and education 
Born Alexandra Isley, she is the daughter of Ernie Isley of the prolific soul group the Isley Brothers. Isley spent most of her childhood in New Jersey before moving to Los Angeles. She named Stevie Wonder, Prince, Ella Fitzgerald, Toni Braxton, Aaliyah, and Mariah Carey as early favorite musicians. She loved singing from childhood and her family supported her pursuit of music as a professional career.

She began classical vocal training at age 12 and later graduated from LA County High School for the Arts. Isley received her bachelor's degree from UCLA, where she studied in the jazz department.

Isley has synesthesia, and described the phenomenon to LA Weekly: "There's a canvas in my mind, and the whole thing is painted, or it's a continuous wave of color...Sometimes I'll start composing something and I'll have to change the key because the color won't sit right with me."

Career 
Isley released her self-produced debut EP The Love Art/Memoirs in 2012. Okayplayer reviewed the EP positively: "please believe Alex’s lush vocals over her own calming production is capable of spawning a generation of love babies much like “Between The Sheets” did."

Isley described her music as r&b with hip hop and jazz influences. Samantha Callender of Essence referred to her voice as "silky smooth vocals that ride neo-soul melodies." She has collaborated with artists such as 9th Wonder on the track "Rain Clouds"; Lucky Daye and Masego on "Good & Plenty (Remix)"; Chromonicci on "Interstellar"; and Christian Kuria on "Toroka."

In November 2019 she released the joint EP Wilton with producer Jack Dine. In May 2020 Isley performed a concert for NPR's Tiny Desk series. That year she was also a featured vocalist for the Cautious Clay track "Reaching", on the soundtrack for Insecure'''s fourth season.

In 2022 she released Marigold, a collaborative album with Jack Dine. Jackie B. of Soul Bounce reviewed the project positively: "Alex Isley and Jack Dine remain as a melodious match made in heaven as they take us through a cycle from sprout to blossom to full bloom on Marigold''."

Personal life 
Isley resides in Los Angeles. She has a daughter (b. 2017).

Discography

Albums

Extended plays

References

External links 
 Alex Isley on SoundCloud
Alex Isley on Discogs
Alex Isley on Instagram

Year of birth missing (living people)
Living people
African-American women singer-songwriters
American rhythm and blues singers
Singers from Los Angeles
Los Angeles County High School for the Arts alumni
University of California, Los Angeles alumni
21st-century African-American women singers
Singer-songwriters from California